Sundray Tucker (born March 23, 1948) is an American singer. She is the eldest daughter of the late Ira Tucker (of the Dixie Hummingbirds) and Louise Tucker. Her sister is Lynda Laurence, once a member of the Supremes, and her brother is Ira Tucker Jr.

Early career
Born and raised in Philadelphia, Sundray was a member of an earlier version of Patti LaBelle and the Bluebelles, the Ordettes; she left the group due to troubles in school before the group changed its name to the Blue Belles (later Bluebelles). Sundray also performed under the name Cindy Scott. Her most notable single was the Northern Soul classic "I Love You Baby", backed with "In Your Spare Time".

In 1967, Sundray joined the Three Degrees and performed alongside Fayette Pinkney and Sheila Ferguson for touring purposes only.

Stevie Wonder
Sundray joined her sister Lynda and third member Terri Hendricks on the road as back-up vocalists for Stevie Wonder on a tour to promote Signed, Sealed & Delivered in early 1970. The group were known as the Third Generation, which became Stevie's resident backing group, Wonderlove. Sundray's stay with this group was relatively short-lived as she joined Ernie Terrell and the Heavyweights as lead vocalist, replacing departing member Jean Terrell. In 1976 Sundray performed background vocals for Stevie Wonder's critically acclaimed album Songs in the Key of Life, providing backing vocals for several tracks, most notably on "Ordinary Pain".

The Supremes
Throughout her long career, Sundray has held a connection to the Supremes in one way or another. Starting off in 1962, Sundray left the group the Ordettes and group member Patti LaBelle to be replaced by Cindy Birdsong. In turn Cindy would leave the group in 1967 to replace departing Supreme Florence Ballard. In 1970 Sundray was recruited to replace Jean Terrell from Ernie Terrell and the Heavyweights as lead vocalist of the group. Jean in her turn was replacing Diana Ross in the Supremes. In 1972 Supremes member Cindy Birdsong announced she would be retiring from the group to concentrate on family life and her initial thought as an ideal replacement was Sundray. Sundray auditioned for the part, but due to contractual obligations was unable to replace Cindy in the Supremes; however her sister Lynda Laurence joined the Supremes with Jean Terrell and Mary Wilson.

Former Ladies of the Supremes
In early 1993 Sundray was approached by Scherrie Payne and Lynda Laurence and was asked to replace departing member Jean Terrell in the Former Ladies of the Supremes. Sundray made her stage debut with Lynda and Scherrie on a tour of Japan in March 1993 and quickly established herself as a fan favorite. The following year Sundray made her recording debut with the group when she appeared on the autumn release of the album Supreme Voices. Sundray had one solo lead track, "I'm A Fool For Love", as well as sharing lead vocals with Scherrie and Lynda on a remake of George Benson's song "Give Me The Night". A re-recording of the Supremes classic 1970 hit "Up The Ladder To The Roof" is another highlight on this album, as is the studio version of the ladies' show-stopper, "How Do You Keep The Music Playing".

The following year another album was released entitled Supremely Yours with liner notes by the noted Motown historian Sharon Davis, this album equalled Supreme Voices. Sundray featured on several shared-lead tracks with Scherrie and Lynda, notably "Feel Like Making Love", "Stop To Love" and another '70s Supremes  re-make, "Touch". Solo leads on the album include "Stop! I Don't Need No Sympathy", "Never Can Say Goodbye" and "Just Like That".

Whilst with the group Sundray re-recorded her own hit "I Love You Baby" which was expected for release on the follow-up album to Supremely Yours. The album project was postponed and ultimately cancelled. In its place the enormous task of re-recording the Supremes songbook was undertaken by the group. It has been reported, but not confirmed, that other tracks were recorded by Sundray while with the group that still await the light of day. One of the unreleased tracks, composed by Sundray and entitled "Nervous", was recorded in April 1996.

In the summer of 1996, Sundray left the FLOS to concentrate on other projects, and was subsequently replaced by Freddi Poole.

Revival
In 1999, it was announced that independent UK label Driving Wheel Records had signed Sundray Tucker. By this time Sundray had reverted to her earlier stage name of Cindy Scott.  Owner/producer David Powner oversaw the creation of the album. Providing backing vocals was longtime friend and former Persianette Vera Carey. The resulting album The Loving Country was released in the autumn of 1999 and received a 4.5 star (out of 5) rating at Allmusic.

In summer 2000, Sundray/Cindy made her UK solo stage debut at the Patshull Golf & Country Club outside Wolverhampton in England. The show was recorded and subsequently released as a souvenir album to limited release in 2002 under the title Live and Red Hot.

Cindy's follow-up studio album, The Loving Country 2, was released in 2004.

In 2016, Cindy Scott recorded two brand new songs for Driving Wheel Records, "Life Iza B" & "Fine Time".

Discography
As Sandra Kay Tucker - Peacock Records
Have It Your Way / I've Got A Good Thing
Nobody Will (unissued)
Step By Step (unissued)

As Cindy Scott And The Cousins - Benn Lee Records
What Are You Doing To Me (unissued)
I Got News (unissued)
Lazy Lover (unissued)

As Cindy Scott - Veep Records
I Love You Baby / In Your Spare Time 
I've Been Loving You Too Long / Time Can Change A Love 

As Cindy Scott - Driving Wheel Records
The Loving Country (Album) 
Live & Red Hot (Album) 
Return To The Loving Country AKA The Loving Country 2 (Album) 
The Loving Country / I've Been Loving You Too Long (7" vinyl)
In Love Maybe (2009 Radio Mix) / In Love Maybe (Original Version) 
Remember Me EP
Take Me Higher (2010 Remix) 
Killing Me Softly (2010 Ibiza Mix) 
The Soul of Cindy Scott (Album) 
Life Beats EP 
In Love Maybe: The Remixes
Loved Up: The Remix Project (Album)
Saturday Night, Sunday Morning: The Remixes
Ain't Nothing Like The Real Thing (Restoration Mix)
The Loving Country - 20th Anniversary Special Edition (Album) 
Life Iza B
The Loving Country - Live - 20th Anniversary Special Edition (Album) 
The Loving Country, Vol. 2 - Special Edition (Album) 
Fine Time (Rinaldo Montezz Flashback Remix)
Life Iza B (Rinaldo Montezz Remix)
Fine Time (Rinaldo Montezz Club Mix)

Duets with Bunny Sigler - Neptune Records
Sure Didn't Take Long
We're Only Human
Conquer The World Together

As Sundray Tucker:
Do Re Mi (unissued)
Don't Know How (unissued)
My Melody (unissued)
Said What I Said (unissued)
You Should Rock, You Should Roll (unissued)
The Last Grand Dance
Mr Lovin'
Tutti Frutti
In Love Maybe (unissued)
If It Was Me/ Ask Millie - TK Records
Fancy Dancer (unissued) - TK Records
Try My Love / Is It Possible - Grace Note Records
Nervous (unissued)
If It Was Me - Driving Wheel Records
Moving on Up (Rinaldo Montezz Funky Drone Mix) - Altair Records
Moving on Up (Rinaldo Montezz Funky Drone Mix) [Radio Edit] - Altair Records
Moving on Up (Rinaldo Montezz Funky Drone Dub Mix) [Radio Edit] - Altair Records
Runaway Love (Rinaldo Montezz Runaway Remix) - Driving Wheel Records
Remember Me (Rinaldo Montezz Anthem Remix) - Driving Wheel Records
Signed, Sealed, Delivered I'm Yours (Rinaldo Montezz Gospel Remix) - Driving Wheel Records
Never Can Say Goodbye (Rinaldo Montezz Remix) - Driving Wheel Records
Sundray Tucker Megamix - Driving Wheel Records
If I Were Your Woman (Rinaldo Montezz Summer Breeze Revisited Remix) - Driving Wheel Records
Moving on Up (Rinaldo Montezz Remix) - Driving Wheel Records

External links
Sundray Tucker biography at the AMG website
Official Site

1948 births
Living people
Musicians from Philadelphia
Singers from Pennsylvania
21st-century African-American women singers
20th-century African-American women singers